The 2019–20 Maine Black Bears men's basketball team represented the University of Maine in the 2019–20 NCAA Division I men's basketball season. They played their home games at the Cross Insurance Center in Bangor, Maine and were led by second-year head coach Richard Barron. They were members of the America East Conference. They finished the season 9–22, 5–11 in America East play to finish in eighth place. They lost in the quarterfinals of the America East tournament to Vermont.

Previous season
The Black Bears finished the 2018–19 season 5–27 overall, 3–13 in conference play to finish in a tie for eighth place. As the 8th seed in the 2019 America East men's basketball tournament, they were defeated by top-seeded Vermont 73–57 in the quarterfinals.

Roster

Schedule and results

|-
!colspan=12 style=| Exhibition

|-
!colspan=12 style=| Non-conference regular season

|-
!colspan=9 style=| America East Conference regular season

|-
!colspan=12 style=| America East tournament
|-

|-

Source

See also
 2019–20 Maine Black Bears women's basketball team

References

Maine Black Bears men's basketball seasons
Maine Black Bears
Maine Black Bears men's basketball
Maine Black Bears men's basketball